Yuliya Halinska (born 27 October 1988) is a blind Ukrainian Paralympic judoka. She has won two Paralympic bronze medals for her country and won three European titles.

References

1988 births
Living people
Paralympic judoka of Ukraine
Judoka at the 2008 Summer Paralympics
Judoka at the 2012 Summer Paralympics
Judoka at the 2016 Summer Paralympics
Medalists at the 2012 Summer Paralympics
Medalists at the 2016 Summer Paralympics
Paralympic medalists in judo
Paralympic bronze medalists for Ukraine